Marius-Pierre Audran (28 September 1816 – 9 January 1887) was a French operatic tenor. He performed at the Opéra-Comique in Paris as the first tenor. His son was acclaimed composer Edmond Audran.

Works

Author 
 La Colombe du soldat (romance) (1851)
 Vous pleurez d'être heureux (romance) (1853)
 Le guide des montagnes (romance dramatique) (1854)
 Veillez sur mon enfant (pray), (1855)
 Prière à la Vierge (1867)
 La mère chrétienne (lullaby) (1870)

Coauthor 
 Le Soir à la Veillée, with Antony Rénal (1843)
 Le Chant du sabotier, with J. P. Schmit (1851)
 Le mot le plus doux (rêverie), with Sylvain Saint-Étienne (1851)
 N'écoute pas les fleurs (romance), with Armand de Lagniau (1851)
 Aimons-nous Mariette (romance), with A. T. Brulon (1852)
 L'Amour s'en va Coumo Ven (romanso nouvello), in provençal, with Marius Bourelly (1853)
 Belange des nuits (Sérénade), with Q. Rénal (1853)
 L'Enfant et l'oiseau (mélodie), with Alexandre St Étienne (1853)
 La Bergeronnette (romance), with Marius Bourrely (1854)
 Mon cœur jalouse (mélodie), with Adolphe Catelin (1854)
 L'Amandier fleuri (mélodie), with J. B. gant (1855)
 Le Vieux vagabond (romance), with Pierre-Jean de Béranger (1855)
 Mon étau (mélodie dramatique), with A. Clesse (1856)
 Jane, pourquoi pleurer ? (romance), with Marius Bourrelly (1860)
 Les 3 moulins (simple histoire), with A. Joubert (1860)
 L'Œuf de Pâques (historiette), with A. Joubert (1865)
 Mélodie du soir (sérénade), with Sylvain Saint-Étienne (1867)
 Au coin du feu (Souvenir d'autrefois), with A. Joubert (1875)
 Lei Mouro (Les mores) (aubade), in provençal and french, with J. Y. Gaut (1877)
 L'Enfant et la rose (romance), with Ch. Chaubet (1878)
 Je pleure encore (romance), with Pierre Lachambeaudie

References 

1816 births
1887 deaths
Musicians from Aix-en-Provence
French operatic tenors
19th-century French male opera singers